Limochores is a genus of skippers in the family Hesperiidae.

Species
Recognised species include:
 Limochores catahorma (Dyar, 1916)
 Limochores pupillus (Plötz, 1882)

References

Natural History Museum Lepidoptera genus database

Hesperiidae genera
Hesperiidae